Dangyaband (or Dengyavin) is a village in the Lerik Rayon of Azerbaijan.

References
 

Populated places in Lerik District